The Kope Formation is one of the three component bedrock formations of the Maquoketa Group that primarily consists of shale (75%) with some limestone (25%) interbedded. In general, it has a bluish-gray color that weathers light gray to yellowish-gray and it occurs in northern Kentucky, southwest Ohio, and southeast Indiana, United States.

Description

Depositional environment 
The depositional environment of the Kope was shallow marine.  The central North American continent was a tropical epeiric sea at the time.

Jennette and Pryor (1993) interpret the Kope, along with the Bellevue and Fairview Formations, as a progradational succession on a carbonate ramp.  The Kope is the most distal facies of the ramp complex.

Notable outcrops 
The type section of the Grand Avenue Member is a cliff to the west of Grand Avenue in Cincinnati, Hamilton County, Ohio.

The type section of the Wesselman Tongue of the Kope Formation is an east-facing embankment on an unnamed creek that is followed by Wesselman Road in Miami Township, Hamilton County, Ohio.

Fossil content 

Brachiopods, trilobites, bryozoans, rugose corals, and echinoderms (including crinoids, asteroids, and edrioasteroids) are all present in the Kope. Due to their mid-continent depositional environment, the fossils are almost free of deformation caused by tectonic activity common in the Appalachian Mountains.

The brachiopods Dalmanella sp., Hebertella sp., Leptaena sp., Petrocrania sp., Philhedra sp., Platystrophia sp., Pseudolingula sp., Rafinesquina sp., Sowerbyella sp., Strophomena sp., Trematis sp., and Zygospira sp. have been recorded from the Cincinnatian Series, which includes the Kope Formation.

The trilobites such as Triarthrus eatoni, Cryptolithus tessellatus, and Proetidella parviusculus have been identified in the Kope, and the Ohio State Fossil, Isotelus maximus, can most likely be found in it.

The bryozoans Ceramophylla sp., Eridotrypa mutabilis, Peronopera vera, Batostoma jamesi, Dekayia aspera, Heterotrypa ulrichi, Parvohallopora sp., and Amplexopora septosa have been found in the Kope.

Among echinoderms, the crinoids Cincinnaticrinus varibrachialis, Ectenocrinus sp., and Iocrinus sp. are present in the Kope.  Edrioasteroids and asteroids (starfish), generally rare, are common in overlying formations, and may be present in the Kope.

Age 
Relative age dating of the Kope places it in the Late Ordovician period.

References

Bibliography 
 Fossils of Ohio, Bulletin 70, Ohio Department of Natural Resources, Division of Geological Survey, Edited by Rodney M. Feldmann and Merrianne Hackathorn, 577 p., 232 plates (some in color), drawings, maps, and tables, 1996.

Geologic formations of Indiana
Geologic formations of Kentucky
Geologic formations of Ohio
Upper Ordovician Series
Ordovician System of North America
Ordovician Ohio
Ordovician Kentucky
Ordovician Indiana
Ordovician south paleopolar deposits
Ordovician southern paleotemperate deposits
Limestone formations of the United States
Shallow marine deposits
Fossiliferous stratigraphic units of North America
Paleontology in Indiana
Paleontology in Kentucky
Paleontology in Ohio
Katian